Quererte Así (Loving You Like This) is a Mexican telenovela produced by Eric Vonn for Azteca. Filming lasted from 30 January 2012 to 15 June 2012. During the week of 16 April, TV Azteca broadcast Quererte Así weeknights at 7:30pm. From 23 April to 25 May, TV Azteca moved the telenovela from 7:30pm to 6pm. From 28 May – 3 August 2012, it was moved again from 6pm to 4pm.

On 27 July, TV Azteca announced that broadcasts of Quererte Así would end on 3 August 2012, due to low ratings, with Corazón Apasionado replacing it. As a result, only 80 episodes were broadcast on Azteca out of the 120 episodes that were filmed. Telenovela is normally sold internationally with 120 episodes.

Cast

Production

Eric Vonn was contracted by Azteca for two new novelas, he wrote first 20 episodes of "Quererte Así" before Azteca decided to film Cielo Rojo at first, so he stopped writing this novela and started to write Cielo Rojo rapidly, after finishing it on 17 November 2011, he continued writing "Quererte Así" and concluded writing on 31 May 2012 with 120 episodes as was planned.
All the crew, and stuff of Cielo Rojo work on this telenovela too.
From 11 to 25 January, producers Ximena Cantuarias and Rafael Uriostegui were busy in casting.
As of 26 January 2012 promos and trailers were filmed.
Opening sequence was directed by Kiko Guerrero and Carlos Somonte and filmed on 27 January 2012.
First promo aired on 4 February 2012.

References

2012 telenovelas
2012 Mexican television series debuts
2012 Mexican television series endings
Mexican telenovelas
TV Azteca telenovelas
Spanish-language telenovelas
Television shows set in Mexico City
Television shows set in Acapulco